= Oseadeeyo Nana Kumi Kodie =

Ghanaian traditional ruler

Development Chief and Traditional Leader
- Incumbent
- Assumed office 1 July 2021

Personal details
- Born: Accra, Ghana
- Website: www.privateofficeofdon.com

Oseadeeyo Nana Kumi Kodie is a Ghanaian traditional Leader in Ghana and CEO of Dadaba Group .

== Early life and education ==
Kumi was born in Accra and christened Nana Kumi Kodie to Elizabeth Amoah and Maxwell Appiahkorang both from the Eastern region of Ghana. Kumi attended Asamankese Senior High school and proceeded to University of Ghana in Legon where he earned a Bachelors degree in Administration.

== Career ==
He is the founder and Chief Executive Officer of the Integrated Business Solutions conglomerate. Through his leadership, Dadaba Group has successfully facilitated investment for the execution of various community development projects in different regions in Ghana including the Eastern, Upper East and Western Regions.

== Philanthropy ==
In January 2023, He donated to orphans, widows above 60 in the Akyem Osiem in the Eastern Region Of Ghana.

== Award and recognition ==
Awards 2021:

- Most Influential Change Maker of the Year - Humanitarian Awards Global
- Special Charity Award Of the year - Ghana Outstanding Women Awards
- Outstanding Young Entrepreneur - Eastern Region Young Entrepreneurs Awards

Awards 2022:

- Philanthropist Of The Year - Supreme Dynamic Talent Academy Awards

Recognition:

- Goodwill ambassadors - UNACWCA Ghana
